The Order of Islamic Revolution is the highest order of the honorary orders in the Islamic Republic of Iran, established by "Council of Iran Ministers" on November 21, 1990. According to "Article 2" of the "Regulations on the Awarding of Government Orders" of Iran, the "Order of Islamic Revolution" is one number for each presidential term which is being given to the President of Iran at the ceremony of the presidential inauguration.

Recipients
 Mohammad Khatami (1997)
 Mahmoud Ahmadinejad (2005)
 Hassan Rouhani (2013)
 Ebrahim Raisi (2021)

See also 
 Order of Merit and Management
 Order of Freedom (Iran)
 Order of Altruism
 Order of Work and Production
 Order of Research
 Order of Mehr
 Order of Justice (Iran)
 Order of Construction
 Order of Knowledge
 Order of Education and Pedagogy
 Order of Persian Politeness
 Order of Independence (Iran)
 Order of Courage (Iran)

References

External links 
 Iran Awarding of Government Orders website
 Types of Iran's Orders and their benefits (Persian)

CS1 uses Persian-language script (fa)
Awards established in 1990
Civil awards and decorations of Iran
1990 establishments in Iran